Fabiola Arizbeth Vargas Curiel (born 23 March 1975) is a Mexican football manager and former player. She is the current manager of Atlas (women). During her career as player she represented Mexico from 1994 to 2001.

Career

Early career
Fabiola Vargas was born in Mexico City on 23 March 1975, she lived her early years in the Tepito neighborhood but later moved to Coacalco in the State of Mexico, where she started playing basketball and football. When she was 17 she decided to dedicate full time to football.

She started playing in local leagues where she was discovered by scouts of the Mexican Football Federation who invited her to join to the Mexico women's national football team.

Club career
In 1997, she moved to Canadá to play with the semi-professional team Omega Soccer.

Vargas retired in 2001.

International career
Vargas represented Mexico from 1994 to 2001. During this time she participated in the 1994 and 1998 CONCACAF Women's Championship and in the 2000 CONCACAF Women's Gold Cup.

Managerial career
Vargas went on to prepare as coach in the National School for Football Coaches in Guadalajara. After graduating in 2003, she coached and worked as an assistant in several amateur and semi-professional teams from Guadalajara, including Gansos de Etzatlán and the football team of the Universidad de Guadalajara.

In 2017, Vargas was invited by Andrea Rodebaugh to work as an assistant manager at Tijuana's female section of the newly created Liga MX Femenil.

On 5 July 2018, Vargas was announced as Necaxa's new manager.

Managerial statistics

References

1975 births
Living people
Footballers from Mexico City
Mexican women's footballers
Mexico women's international footballers
Mexican expatriate women's footballers
Mexican expatriate sportspeople in Canada
Mexican football managers
Women's association football managers
Liga MX Femenil managers
Women's association footballers not categorized by position
Mexican footballers